Series 2 could refer to:

 Apple Watch Series 2, a smart watch by Apple
 Aston Martin Lagonda Series 2, the automobile model
 Aston Martin V8 Series 2, the automobile model
 BMW 2 Series, the automobile model line
 GeForce 2 series, line of nVidia video cards
 Scania 2-series, the truck model line
 GP2 Series, motor racing series
 Super2 Series, motor racing series
 South African Class 6E1, Series 2, electric locomotive series
 Cambrian Series 2, geological series

See also
 200 series (disambiguation)
 System 2 (disambiguation)
 Model 2 (disambiguation)